Enrique Guedes (born 17 July 1932) is a Cuban former sports shooter. He competed in the 50 metre rifle, prone event at the 1968 Summer Olympics.

References

1932 births
Living people
Cuban male sport shooters
Olympic shooters of Cuba
Shooters at the 1968 Summer Olympics
People from Villa Clara Province
20th-century Cuban people